The Eski Imaret Mosque is a former Byzantine church converted into a mosque by the Ottomans. The church has traditionally been identified as belonging to the Monastery of Christ Pantepoptes, meaning "Christ the all-seeing". It is the only documented 11th-century church in Istanbul which survives intact, and represents a key monument of middle Byzantine architecture. Despite that, it remains among the least studied buildings in the city.

Location
The building lies in Istanbul, in the district of Fatih, in the neighbourhood of Zeyrek, one of the poorest areas inside the old walled city. It is less than one kilometre northwest of the even more impressive Zeyrek Mosque.

Identification
It was the Patriarch Constantius I (1830–1834) who identified the Eski Imaret Mosque as the old Pantepoptes church. Although this identification has been generally accepted, Cyril Mango argued that its location didn't allow a complete overview of the Golden Horn, and instead suggested the site currently occupied by the Yavuz Sultan Selim Mosque as an alternative placing for the Pantepoptes Monastery. Austay-Effenberger and Effenberger agreed with Mango, and argued that it might actually have been the Church of St. Constantine, founded by the Empress Theophano in the early 10th century, highlighting its similarities to the contemporaneous Lips Monastery.

History
Some time before 1087, Anna Dalassena, mother of the Byzantine Emperor Alexius I Comnenus, built a convent dedicated to Christos Pantepoptes on the summit of the fourth of Constantinople's seven hills where she retired at the end of her life, following Imperial custom. The convent included a church, also dedicated to the Pantepoptes.

On April 12, 1204, during the siege of Constantinople, Emperor Alexios V Doukas Mourtzouphlos established his headquarters near the monastery. From this vantage point he could watch the Venetian fleet under the command of Doge Enrico Dandolo deploying between the monastery of the Euergetes and the church of St. Mary of the Blachernae before attacking the city. After the successful attack he took flight abandoning his purple tent on the spot, thus allowing Baldwin of Flanders to spend his victory night inside it. The complex was sacked by the Crusaders, and afterwards it was assigned to Benedictine monks from San Giorgio Maggiore in Rome. During the Latin occupation of Constantinople (1204–1261) the building became a Roman Catholic church.

Immediately after the Ottoman conquest of Constantinople in 1453, the church became a mosque, while the monastic buildings were used as a zaviye, medrese and imaret  for the nearby Fatih Mosque, which was then under construction. The Turkish name for the mosque ("Old Soup Kitchen Mosque") recall this.

The complex has been ravaged by fire several times, and the last traces of the monastery disappeared about a century ago. Until 1970 the building was used as a Koran school, which rendered it largely inaccessible for architectural study. In 1970, the mosque was partially closed off and restored by the Turkish architect Fikret Çuhadaroğlu.

Architecture

The building lies on a slope which overlooks the Golden Horn, and rests on a platform which is the ceiling of a cistern. It is hemmed in all sides, making inspection of the exterior difficult. Its masonry consists of brick and stone, and uses the recessed brick technique; it is the oldest extant building of Constantinople in which this technique - which is typical of the Middle Byzantine architecture - can be observed, . In this technique, alternate courses of bricks are mounted behind the line of the wall in a mortar bed. The thickness of the mortar layers is roughly three times greater than that of the brick layers. The brick tiles on the roof are unique among the churches and mosques of Istanbul, which are otherwise covered with lead.
 
The plan belongs to the cross-in-square (or quincunx) type with a central dome and four vaulted crossarms, a sanctuary to the east and an esonarthex and an exonarthex to the west. This appears to be an addition of the Palaiologan period, replacng an older portico, and is divided into three bays. The lateral ones are surmounted by cross vaults, the central one by a dome.

A unique feature of this building is the U-shaped gallery which runs over the narthex and the two western bays of the quincunx. The gallery has windows opening towards both the naos and the crossarm. It is possible that the gallery was built for the private use of the Empress-Mother.

As in many of the surviving Byzantine churches of Istanbul, the four columns which supported the crossing were replaced by piers, and the colonnades at either ends of the crossarms were filled in. The piers divide the nave into three aisles. The side aisles lead into small clover-leaf-shaped chapels to the east, connected to the sanctuary and ended to the east, like the sanctuary, with an apse. These chapels are the prothesis and diaconicon. The Ottomans resurfaced the apses and added a minaret, since lost.

The dome, which during the Ottoman period was given a helmet-like shape, recovered its original scalloped roofline in the restoration of 1970. This is typical of the churches of the Macedonian period. The tent-like roofing of the gallery has also been replaced with tiles that follow the curves of the vaulting.

The exterior has occasional decorative motifs, like sunbursts, meanders, basket-wave patterns and cloisonnés: the latter motif is typical of the Greek architecture of this period but unknown elsewhere in Constantinople. Of the original interior, nothing remains but some marble mouldings, cornices, and doorframes.

Gallery

References

Sources

External links

Eski Imaret Mosque in Archnet
50 pictures of the mosque

Byzantine church buildings in Istanbul
Fatih
11th-century Eastern Orthodox church buildings
Golden Horn